Mendavia is a town and municipality located in the province and autonomous community of Navarre, northern Spain. The Postal code is 31587.

Mendavia is an agricultural town. It produces high-quality asparagus, peaches and a certain variety of large red pepper.

Roque Romero Sainz (died 1997), active promoter of baseball in Spain between 1940 and 1970, was born in Mendavia in 1910. He was the founder of one of the rare baseball clubs in Spain, Pops CB, and became chairman of the Catalan Baseball Federation for a while.

Local celebrations 
 August 23–30, San Juan Bautista.
 January 16, San Antón.

References

External links
 MENDAVIA in the Bernardo Estornés Lasa - Auñamendi Encyclopedia (Euskomedia Fundazioa) 
 Web del ayuntamiento de Mendavia

Municipalities in Navarre